The 1984 United States House of Representatives elections in Rhode Island were held on November 6, 1984 to determine who would represent Rhode Island in the United States House of Representatives. Rhode Island had two seats in the House, apportioned according to the 1980 United States Census. Representatives are elected for two-year terms.

Overview

District 1

District 2

See also
 1984 United States House of Representatives elections

References

Rhode Island
1984
United States House of Representatives